The 27th Annual Grammy Awards were held on February 26, 1985, at Shrine Auditorium, Los Angeles, and were broadcast live in the United States by CBS. They recognized accomplishments by musicians from the year 1984.

Award winners 
Record of the Year
"What's Love Got To Do With It" – Tina Turner
Terry Britten, producer
"Hard Habit To Break" – Chicago
David Foster, producer
"Girls Just Want To Have Fun" – Cyndi Lauper
Rick Chertoff, producer
"The Heart Of Rock And Roll" – Huey Lewis and the News
Huey Lewis and the News, producers
"Dancing In The Dark" – Bruce Springsteen
Jon Landau, Chuck Plotkin, Little Steven & Bruce Springsteen, producers

Album of the Year
Can't Slow Down – Lionel Richie
James Anthony Carmichael & Lionel Richie, producers
She's So Unusual – Cyndi Lauper
Rick Chertoff, producer
Purple Rain – Prince & The Revolution
Prince & The Revolution, producers
Born in the U.S.A. – Bruce Springsteen
Jon Landau, Chuck Plotkin & Bruce Springsteen, producers
Private Dancer – Tina Turner
Terry Britten, Carter, Leon "Ndugu" Chancler, Wilton Felder, Rupert Hine, Joe Sample, Greg Walsh & Martyn Ware, producers

Song of the Year
"What's Love Got To Do With It"
Terry Britten and Graham Lyle, songwriters (Tina Turner)
"Against All Odds (Take a Look at Me Now)"
Phil Collins, songwriter (Phil Collins)
"Hello"
Lionel Richie, songwriter (Lionel Richie)
"I Just Called to Say I Love You"
Stevie Wonder, songwriter (Stevie Wonder)
"Time After Time"
Cyndi Lauper and Rob Hyman, songwriters (Cyndi Lauper)

Best New Artist
Cyndi Lauper
Sheila E.
Frankie Goes to Hollywood
Corey Hart
The Judds

Blues
Best Traditional Blues Recording
Sugar Blue, John P. Hammond, J.B. Hutto & the New Hawks, Luther 'Guitar Junior' Johnson, Koko Taylor & the Blues Machine & Stevie Ray Vaughan & Double Trouble for Blues Explosion

Children's
Best Recording for Children
Ron Haffkine (producer) & Shel Silverstein for Where the Sidewalk Ends

Classical
Best Classical Orchestral Recording
Jay David Saks (producer), Leonard Slatkin (conductor) & the St. Louis Symphony for Prokofiev: Symphony No. 5 in B Flat
Best Classical Vocal Performance
Pierre Boulez (conductor), Heather Harper, Jessye Norman & José van Dam, the BBC Symphony Orchestra & the Ensemble InterContemporain for Ravel: Songs of Maurice Ravel
Best Opera Recording
Michel Glotz (producer), Lorin Maazel (conductor), Julia Migenes-Johnson, Plácido Domingo, Ruggero Raimondi, Faith Esham, the Choeur de Radio France and Maîtrise de Radio France & the Orchestre National de France for Bizet: Carmen (Original Soundtrack)
Best Choral Performance (other than opera)
James Levine (conductor), Margaret Hillis (choir director) & the Chicago Symphony Orchestra & Chorus for Brahms: A German Requiem
Best Classical Performance – Instrumental Soloist or Soloists (with orchestra)
Raymond Leppard (conductor), Wynton Marsalis & the English Chamber Orchestra for Wynton Marsalis, Edita Gruberova: Handel, Purcell, Torelli, Fasch, Molter
Best Classical Performance – Instrumental Soloist or Soloists (without orchestra)
Yo-Yo Ma for Bach: The Unaccompanied Cello Suites
Best Chamber Music Performance
The Juilliard String Quartet for Beethoven: The Late String Quartets
Best New Classical Composition
Samuel Barber (composer) & Christian Badea (conductor) for Antony and Cleopatra
Best Classical Album
John Strauss (producer), Neville Marriner (conductor), the Ambrosian Opera Chorus, Choristers of Westminster Abbey & the Academy of St Martin in the Fields for Amadeus (Original Soundtrack)

Comedy
Best Comedy Recording
"Weird Al" Yankovic for "Eat It"

Composing and arranging
Best Instrumental Composition (tie)
Randy Newman (composer) for "The Natural"
John Williams (composer) for "Olympic Fanfare and Theme" the official music of the XXIII Olympiad
Best Album of Original Score Written for a Motion Picture or A Television Special
Lisa Coleman, John L. Nelson, Prince (musician) & Wendy Melvoin (composers) for Purple Rain performed by Prince 
Best Arrangement on an Instrumental
Quincy Jones & Jeremy Lobbock (arrangers) for "Grace (Gymnastics Theme)" performed by Quincy Jones
Best Instrumental Arrangement Accompanying Vocal(s)
David Foster & Jeremy Lubbock (arrangers) for "Hard Habit To Break" performed by Chicago (band)  
 Best Vocal Arrangement for Two or More Voices
Anita Pointer, June Pointer & Ruth Pointer (arrangers) for "Automatic" performed by The Pointer Sisters

Country
Best Country Vocal Performance, Female
Emmylou Harris for "In My Dreams"
Best Country Vocal Performance, Male
Merle Haggard for "That's the Way Love Goes"
Best Country Performance by a Duo or Group with Vocal
The Judds for "Mama He's Crazy"
Best Country Instrumental Performance
Ricky Skaggs for "Wheel Hoss"
Best Country Song
Steve Goodman (songwriter) for "City of New Orleans" performed by Willie Nelson

Folk
Best Ethnic or Traditional Folk Recording
Elizabeth Cotten for Elizabeth Cotten Live!

Gospel
Best Gospel Performance, Female 
Amy Grant for "Angels"
Best Gospel Performance, Male 
Michael W. Smith for Michael W. Smith 2
Best Gospel Performance by a Duo or Group
Debby Boone & Phil Driscoll for "Keep The Flame Burning"
Best Soul Gospel Performance, Female
Shirley Caesar for Sailin' 
Best Soul Gospel Performance, Male
Andrae Crouch for "Always Remember"
Best Soul Gospel Performance by a Duo or Group
Shirley Caesar & Al Green for "Sailin' on the Sea of Your Love"
Best Inspirational Performance
Donna Summer for "Forgive Me"

Historical
Best Historical Album
J.R. Taylor (producer) for Big Band Jazz performed by Count Basie, Tommy Dorsey, Benny Goodman, Fletcher Henderson, Chick Webb, Paul Whiteman & others

Jazz
Best Jazz Instrumental Performance, Soloist
Wynton Marsalis for  "Hot House Flowers"
Best Jazz Instrumental Performance, Group
Art Blakey for New York Scene performed by Art Blakey & the Jazz Messengers
Best Jazz Instrumental Performance, Big Band
Count Basie for 88 Basie Street
Best Jazz Fusion Performance, Vocal or Instrumental
Pat Metheny Group for First Circle
Best Jazz Vocal Performance
Joe Williams for Nothin' but the Blues

Latin
Best Latin Pop Performance
Plácido Domingo for Siempre en Mi Corazón—Always in My Heart
Best Tropical Latin Performance
Eddie Palmieri for Palo Pa Rumba
Best Mexican-American Performance
Sheena Easton & Luis Miguel for "Me Gustas Tal Como Eres"

Musical show
Best Cast Show Album
Stephen Sondheim (composer & lyricist), Thomas Z. Shepard (producer) & the original cast for Sunday in the Park with George

Music video
Best Video, Short Form
David Bowie for Jazzin' for Blue Jean
Best Video Album
Michael Jackson for Making Michael Jackson's Thriller

Packaging and notes
Best Album Package
Janet Perr (art director) for She's So Unusual performed by Cyndi Lauper
Best Album Notes
Gunther Schuller & Martin Williams (notes writers) for Big Band Jazz performed by Paul Whiteman, Fletcher Henderson, Chick Webb, Tommy Dorsey, Count Basie, Benny Goodman & others

Pop
Best Pop Vocal Performance, Female
Tina Turner for "What's Love Got to Do with It"
Best Pop Vocal Performance, Male
Phil Collins for "Against All Odds (Take A Look At Me Now)"
Best Pop Performance by a Duo or Group with Vocal
The Pointer Sisters for "Jump (For My Love)"
Best Pop Instrumental Performance
Ray Parker Jr. for "Ghostbusters (Instrumental)"

Production and engineering
Best Engineered Recording, Non-Classical
Humberto Gatica (engineer) for Chicago 17 performed by Chicago
Best Engineered Recording, Classical 
Paul Goodman (engineer), Leonard Slatkin (conductor) & the Saint Louis Symphony for Prokofiev: Symphony No. 5 in B Flat, Op. 100
Producer of the Year, Non-Classical (Tie)
James Anthony Carmichael & Lionel Richie 
David Foster
Producer of the Year, Classical
Steven Epstein

R&B
Best R&B Vocal Performance, Female
Chaka Khan for "I Feel for You"
Best R&B Vocal Performance, Male
Billy Ocean for "Caribbean Queen"
Best R&B Performance by a Duo or Group with Vocal
James Ingram & Michael McDonald for "Yah Mo B There"     
Best R&B Instrumental Performance
Herbie Hancock for "Sound System"
Best Rhythm & Blues Song
Prince, songwriter for "I Feel for You" performed by Chaka Khan

Reggae
Best Reggae Recording
Black Uhuru for Anthem

Rock
Best Rock Vocal Performance, Female 
Tina Turner for "Better Be Good to Me"
Best Rock Vocal Performance, Male
Bruce Springsteen for "Dancing in the Dark"
Best Rock Performance by a Duo or Group with Vocal
Prince and The Revolution for Purple Rain
Best Rock Instrumental Performance
Yes for "Cinema"

Spoken
Best Spoken Word or Non-musical Recording
Ben Kingsley for The Words of Gandhi

References

External links
27th Grammy Awards at the Internet Movie Database

 027
1985 in California
1985 music awards
1985 in Los Angeles
1985 in American music
1985 awards in the United States
February 1985 events in the United States